Ndikumana is an African surname, and may refer to:

Janvier Ndikumana, Burundian footballer
Hamad Ndikumana, Rwandan footballer
Madjidi Ndikumana, Burundian footballer
Saidi Ndikumana, Burundian footballer
Selemani Ndikumana, Burundian footballer
Trésor Ndikumana (born 1998), Burundian footballer

Bantu-language surnames